Neil Robertson (born 11 February 1982) is an Australian professional snooker player who is a former world champion and former world number one. The only Australian to have won a ranking event, he is also the only player from outside the United Kingdom to have completed snooker's Triple Crown, having won the World Championship in 2010, the Masters in 2012 and  2022, and the UK Championship in 2013, 2015 and 2020. He has claimed a career total of 23 ranking titles, having won at least one professional tournament every year since 2006.

A prolific break-builder, Robertson has compiled more than 850 century breaks in professional competition, including five maximum breaks. He is the fourth player in professional snooker history to reach the 800-century mark, after Ronnie O'Sullivan, John Higgins and Judd Trump. In the 2013–14 season, he became the first player to make 100 centuries in a single season, finishing with a record 103 centuries.

Life and career

Early career 
Robertson began his snooker career aged 14, when he became the youngest player to make a century break in an Australian ranking event. He began his professional career in the 1998/1999 season. At the age of 17, he reached the third qualifying round of the 1999 World Championship.

In July 2003, he won the World Under-21 Snooker Championship in New Zealand. This earned him a vital wildcard spot on the subsequent WPBSA Main Tour. In December, he won the qualifying tournament for a wildcard place at the 2004 Masters, where he was subsequently defeated 2–6 by Jimmy White in the first round. Robertson lost his first quarter-final match to White too, at the 2004 European Open, by the scoreline of 3–5 this time.

In the 2004–05 season, he moved up to the top 32 in the rankings, reaching the final stages of six of the eight tournaments, despite having to play at least two qualifying matches for each one. In two cases he got as far as the quarter-finals: at the 2005 Welsh Open, where he whitewashed Robert Milkins 5–0 in the first round, then went on to beat both Jimmy White and John Higgins 5–4, before suffering a 5–4 loss himself by the tournament's eventual winner, Ronnie O'Sullivan, after leveling the match from 4–1 behind; and at the 2005 Malta Cup, in which he defeated Mark Williams 5–1, then Jimmy White again by 5–2, but failed to achieve the same against John Higgins, as this time it was the Scotsman who beat the Australian 5–2. At the end of the season, Robertson qualified for the 2005 World Championship, losing 7–10 to Stephen Hendry in the first round.

In 2005–06, he continued to progress, moving up to the top 16 of the rankings. He reached his first semi-final at the 2005 Northern Ireland Trophy, where he led 4–1, but ended up losing 4–6 to Matthew Stevens, who went on to win the event. Robertson also made it to the quarter-finals of the 2005 UK Championship, where he lost 9–5 to ultimate tournament winner Ding Junhui, and the 2006 World Championship, in which he fought back from 8–12 down to level at 12–12 against eventual champion Graeme Dott, before losing the final frame by inadvertently potting the final pink which he needed on the table in his attempts to snooker Dott.

Breakthrough: first ranking title 
Robertson made his breakthrough in the 2006–07 season. After finishing top of his group at the 2006 Grand Prix's round robin stage, losing only his opener match against Nigel Bond by 2–3, Robertson beat Ronnie O'Sullivan 5–1 in the quarter-finals. He went on to the semis, being only the fourth Australian ever to do so in a ranking event. He won 6–2 against Alan McManus to reach his first ranking final, where he faced a fellow first-time finalist, the unseeded Jamie Cope, whom he defeated 9–5 to win his first ever professional ranking tournament. The win earned him £60,000, the highest amount of money he earned in one event up till that point. Afterwards, he had early exits in both the 2006 UK Championship and the 2007 Masters, despite whitewashing Mark Williams 6–0 in the first round of the latter tournament, but he found his form again en route to the final of the 2007 Welsh Open. He defeated Stephen Hendry 5–3, making a break of 141 in the last frame, then recovered from 3–4 down to overcome Ronnie O'Sullivan 5–4 in the quarter-finals. After that he beat Steve Davis 6–3 in the semi-finals, and surprise finalist Andrew Higginson 9–8 in the final to take the title. Robertson led 6–2 after the first session, then dropped six frames in a row to come within one frame of defeat, but took the remaining three frames to win the match. At the season's end, he reached the second round of the 2007 World Championship, but lost 10–13 to Ronnie O'Sullivan despite winning six frames in a row at one stage.

Robertson started the 2007–08 season poorly, making early exits in three of the first four ranking events, as well as at the 2008 Masters and the 2008 Malta Cup. He did reach the quarter-finals of the 2007 Northern Ireland Trophy though, after wins over Jamie Cope and Ian McCulloch, but there he lost 2–5 to Stephen Maguire. His Welsh Open title defence also ended early, as he was defeated in the last 16 by Ali Carter 5–3, even though Robertson pulled back three frames in a row after being 4–0 down. He finished the season ranked 10th, but outside the top sixteen on the one-year list.

2008–09 season 
After a disappointing start to the 2008–09 season, Robertson reached the final of the 2008 Bahrain Championship, where he played Matthew Stevens. The match lasted almost six hours in total, with the Australian edging it 9–7. In the second half of the season, during their quarter-final match at the 2009 Masters, Robertson and opponent Stephen Maguire set a record of five consecutive century breaks. Robertson made two centuries and Maguire made three, the latter sealing a 6–3 win over the Australian with his third. Next month, Robertson reached the semi-finals of the 2009 Welsh Open, but lost to eventual runner-up Joe Swail. At the 2009 World Championship, Robertson defeated Steve Davis, Ali Carter and Stephen Maguire to reach the semi-finals of the World Championship for the first time, before losing to Shaun Murphy 14–17, after recovering from 7–14 behind to level at 14–14.

2009–10 season 
In October 2009, Robertson clinched the 2009 Grand Prix trophy in Glasgow with a 9–4 win over China's Ding Junhui in the final. His semi-final match with defending champion John Higgins was won on the final black of the deciding frame. He also made his 100th career century during the event. Robertson's fourth title made him the most successful player from outside the UK and Ireland in ranking tournaments, although Ding Junhui equalled his total at that season's UK Championship.

On 1 April 2010, Robertson made the first official maximum break of his career in his second round match in the 2010 China Open against Peter Ebdon.

At the 2010 World Championship, Robertson defeated Fergal O'Brien 10–5 in the first round. In his second round match against Martin Gould, Robertson trailed 0–6 and 5–11 before recovering to win the match 13–12. He defeated Steve Davis 13–5 in the quarter-finals. He faced Ali Carter in the semi-finals, winning 17–12 to reach the final. There he defeated 2006 champion Graeme Dott 18–13 to become only the third player from outside the UK, only the second from outside the UK and Ireland, and the first Australian to become world champion in the modern era of the game. (Although the record books show Australian Horace Lindrum triumphed in 1952, that was the year when the sport's leading players staged a boycott so Lindrum has not been widely regarded as a credible world champion.) The win took Robertson to a career-high ranking of world number two in the following season.

2010–11 season 
At the start of the new season Robertson lost in the first round of the 2010 Shanghai Masters to Peter Ebdon. However, at the World Open, where he was drawn in the last 64 against Graeme Dott in a repeat of their world final, Robertson won 3–1, then went on to beat David Morris, Andrew Higginson, Ricky Walden and Mark Williams before producing an assured display to beat Ronnie O'Sullivan 5–1 in the final, to confirm his position as the eighth world number one in snooker. He was invited to the Premier League Snooker, where he reached the semi-final, but lost 1–5 against O'Sullivan. Robertson reached the quarter-finals of the UK Championship, where he lost 7–9 to Shaun Murphy, then also reached the quarter-finals of the Masters, but lost again, by 4–6 to Mark Allen. He was defeated in the first round of the German Masters too. At the next two ranking tournaments he lost in the second round, 1–4 against Graeme Dott at the Welsh Open and 1–5 against Peter Ebdon at the China Open, and he could not defend his World Snooker Championship title either, as he lost 8–10 in the first round against eventual finalist Judd Trump.

2011–12 season 

Robertson's season started in a disappointing fashion as he lost 4–5 to Dominic Dale in the last 16 of his home tournament, the Australian Goldfields Open. However, his form soon improved and at the next world ranking event, the Shanghai Masters, he dismissed Liang Wenbo, Michael Holt and John Higgins, before losing 5–6 to Mark Williams in a tightly contested semi-final.
His first silverware of the season came in Warsaw at the PTC Event 6, where he beat Ricky Walden 4–1 in the final. This success was quickly followed up by another PTC title in Event 8 where he won by a 4–1 scoreline again, this time against Judd Trump. Victory ensured that Robertson maintained his record of never having lost in a ranking event final. He would later finish third in the Order of Merit and therefore qualify for the 2012 PTC Finals. His fine form continued into the UK Championship in York, where he beat Tom Ford, Graeme Dott and Ding Junhui en route to his first semi-final in the event. He played Judd Trump and lost in an extremely tight encounter, 7–9, with there never being more than two frames between the players throughout the match.

Robertson won the 2012 Masters by defeating Shaun Murphy 10–6 in his first Masters final. He beat Mark Allen and Mark Williams in the opening two rounds, before facing Judd Trump in the semi-finals for the second successive major tournament. He exacted revenge for his defeat in York a month earlier by winning 6–3, and said after the match that he had been spurred on by fans cheering when Trump fluked shots. Such was Robertson's feeling that he lacked support from the local crowd, he offered to buy a pint of beer for anyone attending his matches in an Australian hat or shirt, but only one person heeded this call in his semi-final match against Mark Williams. In the final he opened up a 5–3 lead over Murphy in the first session and, although he lost the first frame upon the resumption of play, won four frames in a row to stand on the edge of the title. Despite a brief fightback from the Englishman, Robertson secured the frame he needed with a break of 70 to become the fourth man from outside the United Kingdom to win the event.

Robertson did not advance beyond the second round in any of his next three ranking events, and then saw his run of televised finals without defeat finally come to an end when he was beaten 4–0 by Stephen Lee in the PTC Finals.
He lost in the quarter-finals of the China Open 3–5 to Peter Ebdon, before drawing 1997 champion Ken Doherty in the first round of the World Championship. Robertson won the match 10–4, then beat qualifier David Gilbert 13–9 to set up a quarter-final clash with Ronnie O'Sullivan. Robertson was 5–3 ahead after the first session, but his opponent produced a match defining run of six frames in a row and went on to win 13–10. Robertson finished the season ranked world number seven.

2012–13 season 

Robertson once again began the season poorly as he lost in the first round of the Wuxi Classic, and the second round of both the Australian Goldfields Open and the Shanghai Masters. He returned to form at the minor-ranking Gdynia Open in Poland by defeating Jamie Burnett 4–3 in the final. At the inaugural International Championship in Chengdu, China, Robertson saw off Ryan Day, Matthew Stevens, Lü Haotian, and Shaun Murphy in the semi-finals by the scoreline of 9–5, to reach the final. There he led Judd Trump 8–6, but lost four consecutive frames to suffer an 8–10 defeat. He enjoyed a comfortable passage into the quarter-finals of the UK Championship with 6–1 and 6–2 wins over Tom Ford and Barry Hawkins respectively, to face Mark Selby. Robertson squandered a 4–0 lead to lose 4–6 in a match that finished after midnight.

Robertson started 2013 by attempting to defend his Masters title. He produced a comeback in the first round against Ding Junhui by taking the final three frames in a 6–5 triumph, shouting "You beauty!" when he potted the clinching red. Another deciding frame followed in the next round against Mark Allen, with Robertson making a 105 break in it to progress to the semi-finals, where he had a more comfortable 6–2 win against Shaun Murphy. Robertson won three frames from 3–8 down to Mark Selby in the final, before Selby held off the fightback by taking the two frames he required to win 10–6. Robertson was beaten in the semi-finals of both the German Masters (2–6 to Ali Carter) and the World Open (5–6 to Matthew Stevens). Robertson's Gdynia Open victory earlier in the season helped him finish fifth on the PTC Order of Merit to qualify for the Finals. Wins over Jamie Burnett, Barry Hawkins, Xiao Guodong and Tom Ford saw him reach the final. He faced Ding Junhui, and from 3–0 ahead went on to lose 3–4, meaning that Robertson, after having won his first six, had now lost his last three ranking finals, along with a fourth major final at the Masters.

Robertson returned to form at the China Open and won his seventh career ranking event. He advanced to the final by defeating Jimmy Robertson 5–0, Mark Allen 5–1, Marcus Campbell 5–2 and Stephen Maguire 6–5 (after fighting back from 2–4 down). He exacted revenge over Mark Selby for his 10–6 Masters loss in January by beating the Englishman by the same scoreline, moving to world number two in the process. Despite appearing to be in top form for the World Championship, he lost to Robert Milkins 8–10 in the first round, saying afterwards that he should have gone out to win the match rather than getting too involved in safety. Robertson finished the season ranked world number two for the second time in his career.

2013–14 season 
In May 2013, Robertson made the second official maximum break of his career in the Wuxi Classic qualifiers against Mohamed Khairy. In the main stage of the tournament, he defeated John Higgins 10–7 in the final to secure his eighth ranking event title. He came from 2–5 down against Higgins to lead 8–5 before withstanding a fightback to complete the victory and ensure his second consecutive ranking event win in China. In his home tournament, the Australian Goldfields Open, Robertson made it past the second round for the first time in the three stagings of the event, before continuing his run by beating Joe Perry 5–2 in the quarter-finals and Mark Selby 6–3 in the semis. He would have become the first man since Ronnie O'Sullivan in 2003 to win back to back ranking events in the same season, but he lost 6–9 to Hong Kong's Marco Fu in the final. On 8 December 2013, he defeated Mark Selby 10–7 in the final of the UK Championship, becoming the first overseas player to win all Triple Crown events.

In January 2014, during the Championship League, Robertson reached 63 century breaks in a single professional season, breaking the previous record of 61 centuries held by Judd Trump. By early February, he had reached 78 centuries, a feat that Ronnie O'Sullivan called "probably the most phenomenal scoring in the history of the game." In February, he made his 88th century of the season while playing Mark Williams in the last 32 of the Welsh Open, but went on to lose 4–3.
At the World Open, he extended his season total to 92 centuries, but lost 5–4 on a re-spotted black against Marco Fu in the last 32. 
At the China Open he won a trio of deciding frames before beating Graeme Dott and Ali Carter to reach the final, where he lost 10–5 to Ding Junhui.
He added one more century break during the event, and extended the total to 99 in his first two World Championship matches. He missed a black on a break of 94 that would have seen him reach the 100 milestone during his win over Mark Allen. However, in the 22nd frame of his quarter-final clash against Judd Trump, Robertson made his 100th century break of the season, which also levelled the scores at 11–11. Robertson, having trailed 6–2 and 11–8, went on to win the match 13–11 to set up a semi-final against Mark Selby. Selby, the eventual champion, defeated him 17–15 in a high-quality match that saw Robertson make three more century breaks to end his tally for the season at 103. He ended the campaign as the world number three.

2014–15 season 
Robertson beat Shaun Murphy on the final black in the quarter-finals of the 2014 Wuxi Classic to win 5–4, and then beat Barry Hawkins 6–3 to reach the opening ranking event final of the 2014–15 season. He played friend and practice partner Joe Perry, and rallied from 3–0 behind to lead 8–6, before Perry won three frames in a row to be one away from the title. Robertson then produced breaks of 87 and 78 to win the title 10–9, and paid tribute to Perry's influence on his own career after the match. A week later he comfortably won through to the final of his home event, the Australian Goldfields Open, without any of his opponents taking more than two frames off him, but he was beaten in the final for the second year in a row, this time 9–5 by Judd Trump. Robertson, however, reclaimed the world number one spot afterwards. He then had early exits at the Shanghai Masters and the International Championship, and was knocked out at the semi-final stage of the Champion of Champions 6–4, by Trump again.

Robertson trailed Graeme Dott 5–0 in the fourth round of the UK Championship, but then made five breaks above 50, which included two centuries, to draw level, before falling short of a big comeback as Dott took the final frame to win 6–5. He produced his best snooker to reach the final of the Masters by defeating Ali Carter 6–1 in the quarter-finals and Ronnie O'Sullivan 6–1 in the semis. The latter victory marked the first time O'Sullivan had been eliminated at that stage of the event after 10 previous wins, and also ended a run of 15 consecutive wins in all competitions. However, in the final Robertson suffered the heaviest defeat in the Masters since 1988, as Shaun Murphy thrashed him 10–2. Next month, Robertson did not lose a frame in reaching the quarter-finals of the German Masters, but when he accidentally potted the black in the deciding frame, Stephen Maguire got the two snookers he required and went on to clear the table to win 5–4. At the Welsh Open, in his fourth round match against Gary Wilson, Robertson was forced to concede the fifth frame when he failed to hit a red three times in a row, then lost the next frame to exit the tournament. The Australian won his only European Tour event this year at the Gdynia Open by beating Mark Williams 4–0, meaning he has now claimed three titles in Poland during his career.

Robertson enjoyed comfortable 10–2 and 13–5 wins over Jamie Jones and Ali Carter to face Barry Hawkins in the quarter-finals of the World Championship. It was an extremely high quality encounter as both players compiled four centuries to match a Crucible record in a best of 25 frame match, but eventually Robertson lost 13–12. He made 11 centuries in the event, which included a 143 in the first round, a 145 in the second, and breaks of 141 and 142 in the final session of the match. Despite this, Robertson, who had won four ranking titles since his world title in 2010, stated that he believed he had underachieved in his career.

2015–16 season 
Robertson exited in round one of the first two ranking events in the 2015–16 season, and lost 6–4 to Mark Selby in the quarter-finals of the International Championship. He then claimed his first major title in over 12 months by beating Mark Allen 10–5 in the final of the Champion of Champions. At the UK Championship, in their third round match, Thepchaiya Un-Nooh missed the final black for a 147, before Robertson made a 145 break in the next frame and went on to win 6–2. After that he saw off Stephen Maguire 6–1, John Higgins 6–5 and Mark Selby 6–0 to capture the title for the second time with a 10–5 win against Liang Wenbo.  Robertson became the first player to make a 147 break in a Triple Crown final in the sixth frame of this match. It was also the first final in the event not to feature a player from the United Kingdom.

Robertson and Judd Trump set a record of six centuries in a best-of-11 frame match (four from Trump and two from Robertson) in the second round of the Masters, with Trump progressing 6–5. Robertson proclaimed the match as the greatest ever at the Masters. Later he was on the receiving end of a 147 break during his quarter-final match with Ding Junhui in the Welsh Open, but the Australian prevailed 5–2. He then overcame Mark Allen 6–4 in the semi-finals to set up a final with Ronnie O'Sullivan. Despite leading 5–2, Robertson lost 9–5 as O'Sullivan produced a comeback by winning seven frames in a row. Following this he ended the season with three first round defeats.

2016–17 season 
At the Riga Masters, Robertson did not lose more than one frame in any match as he reached the final, in which he secured his 12th ranking title with a 5–2 win over Michael Holt. He reached the semi-finals of the World Open, but lost 6–2 to Joe Perry. He also played in the semi-finals of the European Masters where he was defeated 6–0 by Ronnie O'Sullivan, then lost 6–3 to Peter Lines in the first round of the UK Championship. Similar to last year, he was beaten in the quarter-finals of the Masters, by O'Sullivan 6–3, and was also knocked out at the same stage in the World Grand Prix, the Gibraltar Open and the Players Championship. After losing 13–11 to Marco Fu in the second round of the World Championship in a performance he described as garbage, Robertson said that next season he would be playing with more passion and aggression to improve his game and make it more interesting for the viewing public.

2017–18 season 
Robertson was the winner of the 2017 Hong Kong Masters, besting Ronnie O'Sullivan 6–3. Later in the season he reached the quarter-finals of the English Open where he lost 5–3 to Anthony McGill. In December he won the Scottish Open, coming from 4–8 down to win 9–8 in the final against Cao Yupeng.

In 2018 Robertson was a quarter-finalist yet again at the 2018 Players Championship, but suffered a 1–6 defeat by Judd Trump. He exited the 2018 China Open at the semi-finals, losing 6–10 to Barry Hawkins.

2018–19 season 
At the 2018 Riga Masters, Robertson won the event for the second time by defeating Stuart Carrington in the semi-final and then Jack Lisowski 5–2 in the final. He also reached the final at the 2018 International Championship, but lost 5–10 against Mark Allen, to whom Robertson also lost the quarter-final of the 2018 Champion of Champions 1–6 a few days later.

In the season's second half, Robertson won the Welsh Open, winning 9–7 over Stuart Bingham, then became runner-up to Ronnie O'Sullivan in the Players Championship and the Tour Championship. He also made it into the semi-finals of the Masters, but lost to eventual winner Judd Trump 6–4. Nearing the end of the season Robertson won the China Open after defeating Lisowski again, this time 11–4. At the World Snooker Championship, he beat Michael Georgiou 10–1, then defeated Shaun Murphy 13–6 in the second round, and finally played John Higgins in the quarter-finals, where he lost 10–13.

2019–20 season 
Robertson started the season as world number four. Due to technical issues linked with the flight, he was not able to defend his title at the opening ranking tournament of the season, the Riga Masters. Later he reached the semi-final at the non-ranking Shanghai Masters, but he was beaten 6–10 by Ronnie O'Sullivan. In November, Robertson won the invitational Champion of Champions after defeating Judd Trump 10–9 in the final. However, in the first half of the season he failed to reach the quarter-finals at any ranking tournament. As world number five, he had qualified for the Masters, but lost in the first round to Stephen Maguire 5–6 in spite of leading 5–1.

After the Masters, he produced fabulous form, reaching three consecutive ranking finals at the European Masters, German Masters and the World Grand Prix. He won the European Masters, whitewashing Zhou Yuelong 9–0, and the World Grand Prix by defeating Graeme Dott 10–8. At the German Masters, he fell short to world number one Judd Trump with the result of 6–9. As a result of these performances he reached second place in the world rankings again.

Robertson's title defence ended at the quarter-final stage of the Welsh Open after being whitewashed by Kyren Wilson 0–5. He also lost in the quarter-finals both in the 2020 Tour Championship and the 2020 World Snooker Championship.

2020–21 season 
In the first half of the season, Robertson was the runner up of the 2020 English Open, losing it 9–8 to Judd Trump, and the 2020 Champion of Champions, being bested by Mark Allen 10–6. In December, he won his third UK Championship title, defeating Trump 10–9 in the 2020 edition of the tournament. He went on to lose in the first round at the World Grand Prix though, by 4–2 to Robert Milkins, and at the start of the second half of the season he suffered yet another 6–5 first round exit at the Masters, losing this time to Yan Bingtao, the event's eventual winner. In March, he won the 2021 Tour Championship, beating Ronnie O'Sullivan 10–4 in the final. He was quarter-finalist three other times throughout the season, in the 2020 European Masters (2020–21 season), the 2021 Players Championship, and yet again in the World Championship, for the third time in a row.

2021–22 season 
In November, Robertson won the English Open by defeating John Higgins 9–8. Later that month, he was to defend his UK Championship title, but got knocked out in the first round by John Astley. He reached the quarter-finals of the 2021 Champion of Champions, where he was defeated 6–4 by Kyren Wilson, and the final of the 2021 World Grand Prix, which he lost 10–8 to Ronnie O'Sullivan.
In the second half of the season, he won the Masters for the second time. After that, he won the Players Championship, beating Barry Hawkins both times, by the scoreline of 10–4 and 10–5 respectively. In April, he defended his Tour Championship title, winning 10–9 against John Higgins in the final, coming back after trailing 8–3 and 9–4 in the match. At the end of the season, he made his fifth maximum break at the World Championship, in the 19th frame of his second round match against Jack Lisowski, though eventually he ended up losing 12–13 in a decider.

2022–23 season 
Robertson has missed the Championship League event in Leicester, as well as the European Masters in Fürth and the British Open in Milton Keynes. He has admitted he is comfortable with his decision to opt out of the early action of the new snooker season and said:
 I used to play in most tournaments, but I'm playing for fun now. I've got a young family now so I don't need to play in every tournament these days. My family is really important to me, they're my inspiration to win.
He did participate in the 2022 World Mixed Doubles though, ending up as the winning pair with Mink Nutcharut, beating Mark Selby and Rebecca Kenna 4–2.

Later on in the season, he exited at the semi-final stage of the Hong Kong Masters, losing to Ronnie O'Sullivan 6–4; the Northern Ireland Open, being beaten by Mark Allen 6–2; the Scottish Open, in which he was defeated by Joe O'Connor 6–3; and the English Open, where his 6–4 loss to Mark Selby saw the end of his title defence. He failed to defend his Masters title in a similar fashion at the start of the next year, as he lost 6–4 there too, against Shaun Murphy in the opening match of the 2023 tournament, despite of a comeback from 5–1 down. Robertson's next more notable result came at the 2023 Championship League, where he made it to the semi-finals before he got knocked out 3–0 by Judd Trump.

Personal life 
Robertson was born in Melbourne to Ian Robertson and Alison Hunter, who are both British nationals. He has a younger brother, Marc Robertson, a former snooker amateur and current professional pool player. Robertson attended Norwood Secondary College in Ringwood. He is now based in Cambridge, England. He has previously practised at Willie Thorne's snooker club in Leicester and Cambridge Snooker Centre, but is now based at WT's Snooker and Sporting Club in Cambridge. 

Robertson has two children with his Norwegian wife Mille Fjelldal, whom he met in 2008 and married in August 2021. Fjelldal had been due to give birth to the couple's first child while Robertson was playing in the 2010 World Championship final, but their son Alexander was not born until 12 May 2010. Their daughter Penelope was born on 16 March 2019. Robertson has spoken publicly about supporting his wife through her struggles with anxiety and depression, while also acknowledging how these issues affected his commitment to professional snooker.

Robertson has been a vegan since 2014. He began to pursue a plant-based diet following advice from fellow snooker professional Peter Ebdon, as well as his admiration for vegan athlete Carl Lewis.

Robertson is a friend of former England footballer John Terry, and is an avid supporter of Chelsea FC.

In June 2016, he became ambassador of electronic snooker simulator app Snooker Live Pro. He was an avid gamer but gave up the hobby in April 2017, believing he was spending too much time playing games and it was affecting his snooker form.

Performance and rankings timeline

Career finals

Ranking finals: 36 (23 titles)

Minor-ranking finals: 5 (4 titles)

Non-ranking finals: 12 (7 titles)
{|
|-
|  style="width:40%; vertical-align:top; text-align:left;"|

Pro-am finals: 2

Team finals: 2 (2 titles)

Amateur titles 
 Australian U21 Championship – 2000, 2003
 Oceania Championship – 2000
 South Australian Open Championship – 2001
 Victorian Open Championship – 2001, 2002
 Australian Open Championship – 2002
 Fred Osborne Memorial – 2002, 2004
 Lance Pannell Classic – 2002, 2004
 Central Coast Leagues Club Classic – 2003, 2004, 2006, 2007
 IBSF World Under-21 Championship – 2003
 West Coast International – 2004, 2005, 2006, 2007
 Kings Australia Cup – 2006, 2008
 City of Melbourne Championship – 2008, 2009

References

External links 

 
Neil Robertson at worldsnooker.com
 
 Profile on Global Snooker

1982 births
Living people
Sportspeople from Melbourne
Australian snooker players
World number one snooker players
Masters (snooker) champions
UK champions (snooker)
Winners of the professional snooker world championship
Competitors at the 2005 World Games
People educated at Norwood Secondary College